Binckes is a surname. Notable people with the surname include:

 Jacob Binckes (1637–1677), Dutch naval officer
 William Binckes (bapt. 1653–1712), English cleric